Same-sex marriage in Colorado has been legally recognized since October 7, 2014. Colorado's state constitutional ban on same-sex marriage was struck down in state district court on July 9, 2014, and by the U.S. District Court for the District of Colorado on July 23, 2014. The Tenth Circuit Court of Appeals had already made similar rulings with respect to such bans in Utah on June 25 and Oklahoma on July 18, which are binding precedents on courts in Colorado. On October 6, 2014, the U.S. Supreme Court declined to hear the Tenth Circuit cases, and the Tenth Circuit lifted its stay. On October 7, 2014, the Colorado Supreme Court and the Tenth Circuit cleared the way for same-sex marriages to begin in Colorado.

Civil unions

Civil unions have been legal since May 1, 2013. Legislation to establish civil unions was passed in the Colorado Senate by 21 votes to 14 on February 11, 2013, and by the House of Representatives on March 12 in a 39–26 vote. Governor John Hickenlooper signed the bill into law on March 21, and the law took effect on May 1. Civil unions, open to both same-sex and opposite-sex couples, provide rights comparable to those enjoyed by married couples, including spousal employer benefits, presumption of paternity, adoption, next of kin rights, inheritance, etc. However, as the federal government does not recognize civil unions, partners in a civil union cannot receive federal benefits.

Same-sex marriage

Statute
In 1996, the Colorado General Assembly passed a bill banning same-sex marriage, but it was vetoed by Governor Roy Romer. In 1997, the General Assembly again passed a bill banning same-sex marriage, but it was again vetoed by Governor Romer. In 2000, Governor Bill Owens signed a bill banning same-sex marriage into law.

Constitution
On November 7, 2006, Colorado voters approved Amendment 43, a state-initiated constitutional amendment that prohibited the recognition of same-sex marriage in the Constitution of Colorado. The amendment passed by a margin of 56% to 44%.

Lawsuits
There are five court cases dealing with same-sex marriage in Colorado. They are Brinkman v. Long, a state district court case, ruling in favor of same-sex marriage; Burns v. Hickenlooper, a U.S. district court (i.e. federal) case, ruling in favor of same-sex marriage; Kitchen v. Herbert and Bishop v. Smith, two decisions out of the Tenth Circuit Court of Appeals which affirm same-sex marriage and are binding precedent on Colorado courts, and Colorado ex rel. Suthers v. Hall, a state court case which previously allowed Boulder County to issue marriage licenses to same-sex couples.

Adams v. Howerton

In 1975, Clela Rorex, the Boulder County Clerk, became the first county clerk in the nation to issue marriage licenses to same-sex couples. She issued marriage licenses to six same-sex couples after the local district attorney interpreted Colorado's statutes, which used the phrase "any two persons", to be gender-neutral with respect to marriage. The state Attorney General, J.D. MacFarlane, issued a contrary opinion that those marriages were invalid, and the licenses were revoked. Dave McCord and Dave Zamora were the first couple to receive a marriage license in Boulder on March 26, 1975.

When one of those married in Boulder tried to use it to sponsor his husband for immigration purposes, he lost his case, Adams v. Howerton, in federal court. In 2016, U.S. Citizenship and Immigration Services granted permanent residency status to Australian national Anthony Sullivan, based on his marriage to Richard Adams in Boulder on April 21, 1975.

Brinkman v. Long

After being denied a marriage license, a lesbian couple filed a lawsuit on October 30, 2013 in state district court. The case, Brinkman v. Long, sought to overturn the state's constitutional ban on same-sex marriage. The couple was joined by nine other same-sex couples who filed a lawsuit, McDaniel-Miccio v. Hickenlooper, also in state district court, seeking the same outcome. The suit named Governor John Hickenlooper and a city clerk responsible for licensing marriages as defendants. Attorney General John Suthers announced he would defend the state's ban.

Brinkman and McDaniel-Miccio were combined for argument in state district court. On July 9, 2014, District Court Judge C. Scott Crabtree ruled that Colorado's same-sex marriage ban violated the plaintiffs' guarantees of equal protection and due process under the Fourteenth Amendment to the U.S. Constitution, stating: "No state since United States v. Windsor has been able to justify its ban under even the rational basis test, much less under the strict scrutiny test." The judge stayed his ruling pending the outcome of appeals.

Judge Hartman's decision in Colorado ex rel. Suthers v. Hall provided legal cover for the Boulder County clerk to issue same-sex marriage licenses as a form of civil disobedience. After Hartman's decision was handed down, the Denver County and Pueblo County clerks began issuing licenses to couples regardless of gender as well, despite Judge Crabtree's stay. When asked to enjoin the Denver County clerk from issuing licenses to same-sex couples, Judge Crabtree refused to take action. On July 14, 2014, Attorney General Suthers appealed Judge Crabtree's inaction to the Colorado Supreme Court. In a separate filing, and seeking a reversal of Judge Hartman's ruling, the Attorney General also asked the high court for an emergency injunction to stop all state clerks from issuing licenses. On July 18, 2014, the Colorado Supreme Court ordered clerks in Adams and Denver counties to stop issuing marriage licenses. The state Supreme Court was scheduled to hear oral arguments regarding the merits of the state's same-sex marriage ban on September 30, 2014.

Burns v. Hickenlooper

Burns v. Hickenlooper was a same-sex marriage case filed on July 1, 2014 in the U.S. District Court for the District of Colorado. The plaintiffs were six same-sex couples who had been legally married in another state but whose marriage Colorado did not legally recognize or who had been refused a Colorado marriage license. The main defendants, Governor Hickenlooper and Attorney General Suthers, agreed with the plaintiffs insofar as having the court issue an injunction declaring the same-sex marriage ban unconstitutional, but they wanted a stay and swift resolution by the U.S. Supreme Court in order to avoid costly litigation.

U.S. District Judge Raymond P. Moore found in favor of the plaintiffs in Burns on July 23, 2014, granting their motion for a preliminary injunction. In his ruling, Judge Moore noticed a split among the state defendants even though they agreed with the plaintiffs' motion: "Defendant Attorney General believed Kitchen [v. Herbert] was incorrect while Defendant Governor believed Kitchen was correctly decided. ...  Nevertheless, the defendants collectively did not oppose the entry of a preliminary injunction, but also asked that the injunction, as well as further proceedings in this matter, be stayed." After finding that the plaintiffs met their burden for an injunction, he rejected the defendants' request for a stay. Immediately after Judge Moore's order was issued, state defendants filed a notice of appeal and asked the Tenth Circuit Court of Appeals for a stay. The appeals court granted the stay on August 21, 2014.

When the U.S. Supreme Court dismissed requests to hear appeals from similar cases from the Tenth Circuit on October 6, Attorney General Suthers asked the Tenth Circuit to lift the stay in this case as well, which would allow the district court's order that Colorado recognize same-sex marriages to take effect. On October 7, the Colorado Supreme Court removed the legal obstacles preventing Colorado's county clerks from issuing marriage licenses to same-sex couples, legalizing same-sex marriage in the state.

Colorado ex rel. Suthers v. Hall

Hillary Hall, the Boulder County Clerk, had been issuing licenses based on her own interpretation of the Tenth Circuit ruling in Kitchen soon after that ruling was handed down. The state Attorney General filed a motion in state district court in an attempt to stay the clerk's actions. However, on July 10, 2014, a day after the Brinkman ruling, District Court Judge Andrew Hartman found that while Hall violated the law—"There is little argument that Clerk Hall is engaging in a form of civil disobedience. She apparently is taking the position posited by St. Augustine and followed notably by Martin Luther King Jr. that, 'an unjust law is no law at all.'"—but he refused to impose a restraining order or injunction upon her, as the state did not meet its high burden for a stay.

On July 21, 2014, the state Attorney General appealed the ruling; in light of the ruling by the state Supreme Court staying license issuance in Adams and Denver counties, the Attorney General also asked Judge Hartman to reconsider his ruling and stay it. Judge Hartman denied the state's request on July 23. The next day, a three-judge panel of the Colorado Court of Appeals again denied the Attorney General's motion. The Colorado Supreme Court, sua sponte on July 29, decided to hear the case and ordered it transferred and requested the record on appeal to be filed before it by October 20, 2014. The state Supreme Court stayed Hall from issuing same-sex marriage licenses in the meantime.

Kitchen v. Herbert

On June 25, 2014, the Tenth Circuit Court of Appeals in the case of Kitchen v. Herbert ruled that Utah's ban on same-sex marriage violated the U.S. Constitution. The ruling in Kitchen is binding on courts in every state within the Circuit, including Colorado. Since the Tenth Circuit stayed implementation of its ruling pending review by the U.S. Supreme Court, courts in Colorado have had to follow the precedent that Kitchen sets and stay subsequent rulings pending the expiration of that stay. Immediately following the decision in Kitchen, the Boulder County clerk began issuing marriage licenses despite the stay. After a state district court refused to stop the clerk (in Colorado ex rel. Suthers v. Hall), Denver County and Pueblo County began issuing marriage licenses to same-sex couples as well. All Colorado counties stopped issuing marriage licenses following stays issued by the Colorado Supreme Court.

When the U.S. Supreme Court dismissed requests to hear an appeal of the Kitchen case on October 6, Attorney General Suthers asked the Tenth Circuit to lift the stay in this case as it related to Colorado, which would allow the district court's order that Colorado recognize same-sex marriages to take effect. On October 7, the Colorado Supreme Court removed the legal obstacles preventing Colorado's county clerks from issuing marriage licenses to same-sex couples, legalizing same-sex marriage in the state.

Common-law marriage cases
Colorado is one of a small number of states that recognizes common-law marriages. Common-law couples are considered legally married without having registered their relationship as a marriage with the state. Parties in a common-law marriage are entitled to all rights, privileges and responsibilities of a legal and binding marriage. Common-law marriages have been recognized in Colorado since 1887, and in 1987 the Colorado Supreme Court, in People v. Lucero, set out requirements for the existence of a common-law marriage. The decision held that couples' conduct, including cohabitation or taking the partner's surname, as well as their reputation in the community, were "factors that most clearly show an intention to be married".

Dean LaFleur and Timothy Pyfer held a commitment ceremony with family and friends in 2003. After the couple separated, Pyfer filed to dissolve the marriage in January 2018. LaFleur argued that he did not mutually agree to enter into a common-law marriage. A Jefferson County District Court judge ruled in the case of In re Marriage of LaFleur and Pyfer that the couple were common-law married. The court awarded $50,000 of LaFleur's retirement to Pyfer and ordered spousal maintenance. Both parties appealed. On January 11, 2021, the Colorado Supreme Court upheld the marriage of LaFleur and Pyfer, and ruled that, pursuant to the U.S. Supreme Court's decision in Obergefell v. Hodges, same-sex couples must be allowed to enter into common-law marriages and the state must retroactively recognize common-law marriages of same-sex couples that occurred prior to the legalization of same-sex marriage. On the issue of division of property and spousal maintenance, the justices sent the case back to the Jefferson County District Court, ordering further review.

Edi Hogsett and Marcia Neale, a couple for thirteen years, separated in January 2015. Hogsett believed the parties were common-law married and petitioned for a dissolution of marriage in Arapahoe County District Court. Neale disagreed and moved to dismiss the petition. A district court judge ruled in the case of In re Marriage of Hogsett and Neale that the couple had not formed a common-law marriage, the Lucero text factors were outdated and granted Neale's motion to dismiss. The Colorado Court of Appeals agreed in December 2018 with the lower court's finding, and noted that pursuant to Obergefell v. Hodges the Lucero factors should be updated. On January 11, 2021, the Colorado Supreme Court agreed. The court noted that the test must be applied flexibly to the facts of each case, explaining that same-sex couples may not be fully open about their relationships due to fears of discrimination and thus may only discuss their relationship with a close community, and prior to the legalization of same-sex marriage, same-sex couples could not file joint taxes or refer to themselves as married on government forms.

Developments after legalization
On June 26, 2015, the U.S. Supreme Court ruled in Obergefell v. Hodges that the Due Process and Equal Protection clauses of the Fourteenth Amendment guarantee same-sex couples the right to marry. The ruling legalized same-sex marriage nationwide in the United States.

On February 3, 2020, four Republican lawmakers introduced a bill to the General Assembly to ban same-sex marriage. Republican leaders quickly distanced themselves from the proposal. Rob Witwer, member of the House of Representatives between 2005 and 2009, said in an interview, "It's a needless provocation and a waste of people's time. The only thing it serves to do is polarize people over an issue that's by-and-large been settled and that public opinion polls show people have accepted." House Minority Leader Patrick Neville said he was unaware of the bill and "hadn't given much thought to the idea of banning gay marriage". Leslie Herod, a member of the Democratic Party, said, "I'll be damned if this bill, these bills, try to take away the rights of my family, the rights of my friends, and the rights of my community, period." The measure was voted down in a marathon hearing in a House committee that stretched into the early hours of February 15, 2020.

On September 15, 2021, Governor Jared Polis married his longtime partner Marlon Reis in a small Jewish ceremony in Boulder. Polis became the first U.S. governor to marry a person of the same sex.

Following the U.S. Supreme Court's decision in Dobbs v. Jackson Women's Health Organization, which overturned Roe v. Wade, in June 2022, some lawmakers announced they would push to codify same-sex marriage in state statutes and place a measure on the ballot to repeal the constitutional amendment banning same-sex marriage. Governor Polis said he would sign such bills into law. In January 2023, Senator Jessie Danielson said, "The legislature has an obligation to do away with that ban to show the communities that we care about (them), that we're gonna stand up and protect them." A constitutional amendment requires a two-thirds majority in both chambers of the General Assembly.

Native American nations
Colorado is home to two Native American tribes: the Southern Ute Indian Tribe and the Ute Mountain Ute Tribe. Same-sex marriages are performed in the latter under federal law. The Bureau of Indian Affairs operates courts established throughout the U.S. under the Code of Federal Regulations (CFR), and "until such time as a particular Indian tribe establishes their own tribal court, the Court of Indian Offenses will act as a tribe's judicial system". Same-sex marriages for Ute Mountain Ute tribal members can thus be performed in these federal CFR courts. The Southern Ute Indian Tribe is not under the jurisdiction of the CFR courts; however, it is unknown if same-sex marriage is legal on their reservation as the tribe has not published its tribal code nor has publicly commented on the issue. Traditionally, some of them married men, others married women, while others remained unmarried. This two-spirit status allowed for marriages between two biological males to be performed in the tribe.

Demographics and marriage statistics
Data from the 2000 U.S. census showed that 10,045 same-sex couples were living in Colorado. By 2005, this had increased to 15,915 couples, likely attributed to same-sex couples' growing willingness to disclose their partnerships on government surveys. Same-sex couples lived in all counties of the state, except Cheyenne and Hinsdale, and constituted 1.1% of coupled households and 0.6% of all households in the state. Most couples lived in Denver, Jefferson and Arapahoe counties, and the counties with the highest percentage of same-sex couples were Denver (1.22% of all county households) and Gilpin (1.13%). Same-sex partners in Colorado were on average younger than opposite-sex partners, and more likely to be employed. In addition, the average and median household incomes of same-sex couples were higher than different-sex couples, but same-sex couples were far less likely to own a home than opposite-sex partners. 14% of same-sex couples in Colorado were raising children under the age of 18, with an estimated 4,091 children living in households headed by same-sex couples in 2005.

Public opinion

{| class="wikitable"
|+style="font-size:100%" | Public opinion for same-sex marriage in Colorado
|-
! style="width:190px;"| Poll source
! style="width:200px;"| Date(s)administered
! class=small | Samplesize
! Margin oferror
! style="width:100px;"| % support
! style="width:100px;"| % opposition
! style="width:40px;"| % no opinion
|-
| Public Religion Research Institute
| align=center| March 8–November 9, 2021
| align=center| ?
| align=center| ?
|  align=center| 77%
| align=center| 23%
| align=center| <0.5%
|-
| Public Religion Research Institute
| align=center| January 7–December 20, 2020
| align=center| 991 random telephoneinterviewees
| align=center| ?
|  align=center| 79%
| align=center| 19%
| align=center| 2%
|-
| Public Religion Research Institute
| align=center| April 5–December 23, 2017
| align=center| 1,210 random telephoneinterviewees
| align=center| ?
|  align=center| 71%
| align=center| 21%
| align=center| 8%
|-
| Public Religion Research Institute
| align=center| May 18, 2016–January 10, 2017
| align=center| 1,657 random telephoneinterviewees
| align=center| ?
|  align=center| 64%
| align=center| 27%
| align=center| 8%
|-
| Public Religion Research Institute
| align=center| April 29, 2015–January 7, 2016
| align=center| 1,346 random telephoneinterviewees
| align=center| ?
|  align=center| 65%
| align=center| 27%
| align=center| 8%
|-
| Public Policy Polling
| align=center| October 16–19, 2014
| align=center| 778 likely voters
| align=center| ± 3.5%
|  align=center| 54%
| align=center| 39%
| align=center| 7%
|-
|align| New York Times/CBS News/YouGov
| align=center| September 20–October 1, 2014
| align=center| 1634 likely voters 
| align=center| ± 2.9%
|  align=center| 54%
| align=center| 35%
| align=center| 12%
|-
| Public Policy Polling
| align=center| July 17–20, 2014
| align=center| 653 voters
| align=center| ± 3.8%
|  align=center| 55%
| align=center| 38%
| align=center| 7%
|-
| Public Religion Research Institute
| align=center| April 2, 2014–January 4, 2015
| align=center| 927 random telephoneinterviewees
| align=center| ?
|  align=center| 60%
| align=center| 32%
| align=center| 8%
|-
| Quinnipiac University
| align=center| April 15–21, 2014
| align=center| 1,298 registered voters
| align=center| ± 2.7%
|  align=center| 61%
| align=center| 33%
| align=center| 7%
|-
| Public Policy Polling
| align=center| March 13–16, 2014
| align=center| 568 registered voters
| align=center| ± 4.1%
|  align=center| 56%
| align=center| 36%
| align=center| 8%
|-
| Public Policy Polling
| align=center| December 3–4, 2013
| align=center| 928 voters
| align=center| ± 3.2%
|  align=center| 53%
| align=center| 38%
| align=center| 9%
|-
| Public Policy Polling
| align=center| April 5–7, 2012
| align=center| 542 voters
| align=center| ± 4.2%
|  align=center| 53%
| align=center| 40%
| align=center| 7%
|-
| Public Policy Polling
| align=center| December 1–4, 2011
| align=center| 793 voters
| align=center| ± 3.5%
|  align=center| 47%
| align=center| 43%
| align=center| 10%
|-
| Public Policy Polling
| align=center| August 4–7, 2011
| align=center| 510 voters
| align=center| ± 4.3%
| align=center| 45%
| align=center| 45%
| align=center| 10%
|-

See also

LGBT rights in Colorado
Recognition of same-sex unions in Colorado
Same-sex marriage in the United States

References

2014 in LGBT history
Colorado law
LGBT in Colorado
Colorado
2014 in Colorado